Prunus sunhangii is a species of cherry native to Hunan and Hubei provinces, China. It grows only on limestone slopes in the Wuling Mountains, 300 to 1200m above sea level. It is similar to Prunus cerasoides but is genetically and morphologically distinct. It has been given the nominal common name Sun Hang cherry in honor of the botanist Hang Sun.

Description
Prunus sunhangii are trees 20 to 25m tall. They resemble P. cerasoides but can be distinguished from them by a number of features. P. sunhangii leaf margins are apex acuminate whereas P. cerasoides leaf margins are apex acuminate to long acuminate. P. sunhangii sepal margins are laxly dentate but P. cerasoides sepals are entire. P. sunhangii petals are longitudinally 2lobed while P. cerasoides petals are emarginate. P. sunhangii flowers have 17 to 25 stamens and P. cerasoides flowers have 32 to 34 stamens.

There are color differences; all P. sunhangii individuals observed have white petals, but some P. cerasoides have pink petals (others have white). P. sunhangii hypanthia are brown, P. cerasoides hypanthia are red through dark red. P. sunhangii drupes are black when ripe, P. cerasoides drupes are purplishblack.

Distribution
Prunus sunhangii has a disjunct distribution from P. cerasoides. P. sunhangii is found only in association with the relict stands of Metasequoia glyptostroboides of Hunan and Hubei provinces but the more widely distributed P. cerasoides is never found there. The area of occupancy of P. sunhangii is only about 75 km2, so it should be considered endangered under the rules of the IUCN.

References

 

sunhangii
Cherries
Trees of China
Endemic flora of China
Plants described in 2019